Militaries and especially their troops are held in high regard in most countries. In the United States, military officers are regarded as having one of the most prestigious jobs.

While military support is very high in most countries, there is variation. While 10% of Canadians viewed the military as "not at all favorable," only 3% of Britons had a "low" or "very low" view of the military. 65% of Russians believe their military does their job "just about always" or "most of the time". In the United States, 89% of white Americans had a "very" or "somewhat" favorable opinion of the military, compared to 77% of Latinos and 72% of blacks.

Change over time
In the United States, public opinion of the military was very low during the Vietnam War. The public perception increased considerably between the early 1970s to the late 1990s, with the exception of briefly after the Gulf War, when support was around 60%, the percentage of Americans who said they had a "very favorable" view of the US military hovered between 20% and 30%. By 2007, 47% claimed a "very favorable" view of the military and 84% expressed a "favorable" view.

Opposition to the Iraq War was comparable to opposition to the Vietnam War, but unlike the Vietnam War, opposition to the Iraq War did not correlate with a significant decrease in public opinion of military personnel themselves.

See also
 Opposition to United States involvement in the Vietnam War
 Iraq War protests
 Opposition to the Iraq War
 Protests against the war in Afghanistan (2001–2014)

References

Military
War
Public opinion